Dori Spivak (born 19 December 1968) is an Israeli attorney. He is the first openly gay judge there. He was appointed to the Tel Aviv Labor Court on February 18, 2011.

Career 
Prior to becoming a judge, he was an activist in the Israeli LGBT community. He served as the chairperson of the Association for Civil Rights in Israel, and the deputy director of Tel Aviv University Buchmann Faculty of Law's legal clinics, legal advisor to the Israeli Gay, Lesbian, Bisexual and Transgender Association and was involved with the Adva Center.

References

Further reading
 Attorney activist details legal wins, political setbacks for Israel’s LGBT community

LGBT judges
LGBT lawyers
Israeli gay men
Israeli lawyers
Harvard Law School alumni
People from Tel Aviv
1968 births
Living people
21st-century Israeli LGBT people